Ilan Ramon  (born Ilan Wolfferman ; June 20, 1954 – February 1, 2003) was an Israeli fighter pilot and later the first Israeli astronaut. Ramon was a Space Shuttle payload specialist of STS-107, the fatal mission of Columbia, in which he and the six other crew members were killed when the spacecraft disintegrated during re-entry. At 48, he was the oldest member of the crew. Ramon is the only foreign recipient of the United States Congressional Space Medal of Honor, which he was awarded posthumously.

Biography
Born in Ramat Gan, Israel, to Tonya (1929–2003) and Eliezer Wolfferman (1923–2006), a family of Ashkenazi Jewish descent, he grew up in Beersheba. His father was from Germany, and his family fled Nazi persecution in 1935. His mother and grandmother were from Poland, and were Holocaust survivors, having been in Auschwitz. They emigrated to Israel in 1949. His first name, Ilan, means "tree" in Hebrew. Ilan Hebraizied his surname from Wolfferman to Ramon, a more "Israeli (Sabra)" name, when he joined the Israeli Air Force (IAF). This was customary and expected of IAF pilots, as well as among IDF senior officers at the time.

Ramon graduated from high school in 1972. In 1987, he graduated with a B.Sc. degree in electronics and computer engineering from Tel Aviv University.

Air Force career

Ilan Ramon was a Colonel (Aluf Mishne) and a fighter pilot in the Israeli Air Force, with thousands of hours of flying experience. He began the fighter pilot's course at the Israeli Air Force Flight Academy in 1972 but was forced to suspend his studies after breaking his hand. He served in an electronic warfare unit in the Sinai during the Yom Kippur War, and afterwards returned to the flight academy. He graduated from the fighter pilots' course in 1974. From 1974 to 1976 he participated in A-4 Skyhawk Basic Training and Operations. From 1976 to 1980 he participated in training and operations for the Mirage IIIC. In 1980, as one of the IAF's establishment team of the first F-16 Squadron in Israel, he attended the F-16 Training Course at Hill Air Force Base, Utah. From 1981 to 1983, he served as the Deputy Squadron Commander B, F-16 Squadron.

In 1981 he was the youngest pilot taking part in Operation Opera, Israel's strike against Iraq's unfinished Osiraq nuclear reactor. The facility was destroyed, killing ten Iraqi soldiers and one French researcher. He participated in the 1982 Lebanon War.

After attending the Tel Aviv University, he served as Deputy Squadron Commander A, 119 Squadron, flying the F-4 Phantom (1988–1990). During 1990, he attended the Squadron Commanders Course and between 1990 and 1992, commanded 117 Squadron, flying the F-16. From 1992 to 1994, he was head of the Aircraft Branch in the Operations Requirement Department. In 1994, he was promoted to the rank of colonel and assigned as head of the Department of Operational Requirement for Weapon Development and Acquisition. He stayed at this post until 1998.

Ramon accumulated over 3,000 flight hours on the A-4, Mirage IIIC, and F-4, and over 1,000 flight hours on the F-16.

NASA experience

NASA on-ground trainings
In 1997, Ramon was selected as a Payload Specialist. He was designated to train as prime for a space shuttle mission with a payload that included a multispectral camera for recording desert aerosol (dust). In July 1998, he reported for training at the Johnson Space Center, Houston, Texas, where he trained until 2003. He flew aboard STS-107, logging 15 days, 22 hours and 20 minutes in space.

Space flight: STS-107, Space Shuttle Columbia

STS-107 Columbia (January 16 – February 1, 2003), a 16-day flight, was a dedicated science and research mission. Working 24 hours a day, in two alternating shifts, the crew successfully conducted approximately 80 experiments.

Personally nonreligious, Ramon performed traditional observance while in orbit: "I feel I am representing all Jews and all Israelis." He was the first spaceflight participant to request kosher food, and marked the Sabbath.

The STS-107 mission ended abruptly when Space Shuttle Columbia was destroyed and its crew died during re-entry, 16 minutes before scheduled landing.

Ramon, whose mother and grandmother were survivors of Auschwitz, was asked by S. Isaac Mekel, director of development at the American Society for Yad Vashem, to take an item from Yad Vashem aboard STS-107. Ramon carried with him a pencil sketch, Moon Landscape, drawn by 16-year-old Petr Ginz, who was murdered in Auschwitz. Ramon also took with him a microfiche copy of the Torah given to him by Israeli president Moshe Katsav and a miniature Torah scroll (from the Holocaust) that was given to him by Prof. Yehoyachin Yosef, a Bergen Belsen survivor. Ramon asked the 1939 Club, a Holocaust survivor organization in Los Angeles, for a symbol of the Holocaust to take into outer space with him. A barbed wire mezuzah by the San Francisco artist Aimee Golant was selected. Ramon also took with him a dollar of the Lubavitcher Rebbe, Rabbi Menachem M. Schneerson. Ramon and the rest of the Columbia crew died over East Texas in the Southern United States during entry into Earth's atmosphere, 16 minutes prior to scheduled landing.

On November 10, 2013, the American Society for Yad Vashem held a special event with the participation of Petr Ginz's nephew and Ramon's son Tal, who performed a song he wrote in memory of his father.

Diary
Among the recovered 40% from the contents of the Columbia Space Shuttle that crashed outside Palestine, Texas, were 37 pages of Ramon's diary, which NASA returned to his wife. His widow, Rona, shared an excerpt with the Israeli public in a display at Jerusalem's Israel Museum. Rona Ramon brought it to Israel Museum forensic experts. Only two pages were displayed, one containing Ramon's notes, and the other is a copy of the Kiddush prayer. Curator Yigal Zalmona said the diary was partially restored in one year, and needed four more, for police scientists to decipher 80% of the text. Zalmona stated: "The diary survived extreme heat in the explosion, extreme atmospheric cold, and then "was attacked by microorganisms and insects. It's almost a miracle that it survived — it's incredible. There is 'no rational explanation' for how it was recovered when most of the shuttle was not, he said." Ramon wrote on the last day of the journal: 
Inscribed in black ink and pencil, it covered the first six days of the 16-day mission.

Family
Ramon was survived by his wife Rona and their four children (Assaf, Tal, Yiftah, and Noa), who were in Florida at the time of the accident.

Assaf Ramon
Ramon's eldest son, Assaf (February 10, 1988 – September 13, 2009), died aged 21 during a routine training flight while piloting his F-16A, three months after graduating from the IAF flight school Hatzerim Airbase as the top cadet in his class. He lost consciousness during a spell of vertigo, as a result of the high speed and G-force conditions to which he was subjected. This led to the plane crash and Ramon's subsequent death. Assaf was considered an excellent pilot. A lieutenant of the Israeli Air Force, he was posthumously promoted to the rank of captain.

Rona Ramon
Ramon's widow, Rona Ramon, served in the Israel Defense Forces as a paramedic and later earned a BA at the Wingate Institute. After Assaf's death, Rona returned to school and earned a master's degree in holistic health at Massachusetts' Lesley University. She also began to lecture about dealing with grief and finding coping mechanisms. She served as founding CEO of the nonprofit Ramon Foundation for youth academic excellence and social leadership through science and technology. Rona died on December 17, 2018, after battling pancreatic cancer. After her death, she was awarded Israel prize for lifetime achievement.

Awards and honors
 Military decorations:
 Yom Kippur War campaign ribbon (1973)
 1982 Lebanon War campaign ribbon (1982)
 F-16 1,000 Flight Hours (1992).
 Posthumously awarded:
 IDF Chief of Staff Medal of Appreciation
 Congressional Space Medal of Honor (Ramon is the only non-U.S. citizen recipient to date) 
 NASA Space Flight Medal

Namesakes

In Israel

Ramon Airport, named in honor of Ilan and Assaf Ramon
The international Ilan Ramon Conference, hosted by the Israel Space Agency
 Ilan Ramon Youth Physics Center, Ben-Gurion University of the Negev, Beersheba
Ramon Control Tower, Ben-Gurion Airport
Ilan Ramon Elementary School, Be'er Ya'akov
Ilan Ramon Elementary School, Jerusalem
Ilan Ramon Junior High School, Kfar Saba
Ilan Ramon Elementary School, Netanya
Ramon Elementary School, Modi'in

Ramon High School, Hod Hasharon
Ilan Ramon Junior High, Kokhav Ya'ir
Ilan Ramon Emergency Center, Kaplan Hospital, Rehovot
Ramon Park, Givat Shmuel
Ilan Ramon Park, space-themed playground, Beersheba

In Canada 
Ilan Ramon Boulevard, Vaughan, Ontario, Canada
Ilan Ramon Crescent, Côte-Saint-Luc (Montreal), Quebec, Canada

In the United States 
Ramon Hall, in the Columbia Village apartments, Florida Institute of Technology
Ilan Ramon AZA #380, Boulder, Colorado
Ilan Ramon BBYO #5378, Oviedo, Florida
Ramon AZA #195 (named after Ilan and Assaf Ramon), Sunnyvale, California
Ilan Ramon Day School, Agoura, California

In space
Asteroid 51828 Ilanramon
Ramon Hill, Columbia Hills on Mars
Ramon Crater, within the Apollo basin, on the far side of the Moon

See also
 Space Shuttle Columbia disaster
 Columbia: The Tragic Loss, a documentary that focuses on Ilan Ramon

References

External links

 
 Photo of Ilan Ramon with Chabad Rabbi Zvi Konikov
 Ilan Ramon STS-107 Crew Memorial
 A collection of articles about Ilan Ramon
 Ilan Ramon Memorial pages in the Israel Science and Technology Directory
 Spacefacts biography of Ilan Ramon
 Excerpts from Ilan Ramon's diary 
 Ramon Foundation

1954 births
2003 deaths
Space Shuttle Columbia disaster
Accidental deaths in Texas
Israeli Air Force personnel
Israeli astronauts
Israeli aviators
Israeli expatriates in the United States
Israeli Ashkenazi Jews
Israeli people of German-Jewish descent
Israeli people of Polish-Jewish descent
People from Ramat Gan
Recipients of the Congressional Space Medal of Honor
Secular Jews
Tel Aviv University alumni
Space Shuttle program astronauts
American Ashkenazi Jews